The Purple Forbidden enclosure ( Zǐ wēi yuán) is one of the San Yuan ( Sān yuán) or Three Enclosures. Stars and constellations of this group lie near the north celestial pole and are visible all year from temperate latitudes in the Northern Hemisphere.

Asterisms

The asterisms are :

See also 
 Twenty-eight mansions

References

Chinese constellations
Chinese astrology